National Higher Education Fund Corporation, abbreviated PTPTN, is an authority responsible for giving study loans to students pursuing tertiary education in Malaysia. This agency is under Ministry of Higher Education.

PTPTN Repayment Exemption

Eligibility
 Candidates are required to obtain a bachelor's degree with first class honours.
 Candidates have attained a full-time course.
 Candidates have completed their studies within the designated time-frame as stated in PTPTN's agreement letter.
 Candidates have completed their studies in the designated course as stated in PTPTN's agreement letter.
 The course attended is accredited by Malaysian Qualifications Agency.
 Candidates must submit the complete application within twelve months from the date of the convocation.

History
The former PTPTN chairman was Wan Saiful Wan Jan, former chief executive of the Institute for Democracy and Economic Affairs and Pakatan Harapan (PH) candidate for Pendang federal seat in the 2018 general election serving from June 2018 to June 2022.
The new government led by Anwar Ibrahim decided that there would be no more political appointments in any government agency causing the chairman position held by Apli Yusof who was appointed by the former government to be vacant immediately, he is the current head of UMNO Kuala Nerus division.

Criticism of PTPTN

Free Education Proposal
Some parties, particularly the opposition parties and student organizations want higher education for free and abolish PTPTN agency. Several demonstrations have been made including a meeting with the government. The government will not make education free for some reason 

Beginning 2015, hardcore PTPTN loan defaulters have been listed inside Central Credit Reference Information System (CCRIS), which is a Bank Negara Malaysia (BNM) database system that stores financial records of Malaysian borrowers.  Defaulters also run the risk of being barred from leaving the country altogether.

References

External links 
 Official website of the PTPTN
 

Federal ministries, departments and agencies of Malaysia
Educational organisations based in Malaysia
Government agencies established in 1997
1997 establishments in Malaysia
Ministry of Higher Education (Malaysia)